The Social Democratic Union (USD) was an electoral alliance established on 27 September 1995 between the Democratic Party (PD) and the Romanian Social Democratic Party (PSDR). The alliance was formed to participate in the 1996 Romanian general election.

Electoral history

Legislative elections

Presidential elections

References

Defunct political party alliances in Romania